Sean Hughes may refer to:
 Sean Hughes (boxer) (born 1982), English boxer
 Sean Hughes (comedian) (1965–2017), English-born Irish stand-up comedian, writer and actor
 Sean Hughes (Irish republican), alleged IRA member
 Sean Hughes (politician) (1946–1990), British Labour Party Member of Parliament, 1983–1990
 Sean P. F. Hughes (born 1941), British emeritus professor of orthopaedic surgery
 Sean Hughes, bassist with Green Day

See also
 Shaun M. Hughes, Australian astronomer
 Hughes (surname)
 List of people named Sean